Bonanza is an unincorporated community in Floyd County, Kentucky, United States. Their post office closed in July 1969.

References

Unincorporated communities in Floyd County, Kentucky
Unincorporated communities in Kentucky